The fifth series of the British historical drama television series Downton Abbey broadcast from 21 September 2014 to 9 November 2014, comprising a total of eight episodes and one Christmas Special episode broadcast on 25 December 2014. The series was broadcast on ITV in the United Kingdom and on PBS in the United States, which supported the production as part of its Masterpiece Classic anthology.

Series overview
In 1924, a Russian exile, Prince Kuragin, wishes to renew his past affections for the Dowager Countess. The Countess instead locates his wife in Hong Kong and reunites the prince and his estranged wife. Scotland Yard and the local police investigate Mr Green's death. Violet learns that Marigold is Edith's daughter. Meanwhile, Mrs Drewe, not knowing Marigold's true parentage, resents Edith's constant visits. To increase his chances with Mary, Charles Blake plots to reunite Gillingham with his ex-fiancée, Mabel. After Edith inherits Michael Gregson's publishing company, she removes Marigold from the Drewes. Simon Bricker, an art expert interested in one of Downton's paintings, shows his true intentions toward Cora and is thrown out by Robert, causing a temporary rift between the couple.

Mrs Patmore's decision to invest her inheritance in property inspires Carson to do the same. He suggests that head housekeeper Mrs Hughes invest with him; she confesses she has no money due to supporting a mentally incapacitated sister. The Crawleys' cousin, Lady Rose, daughter of Lord and Lady Flintshire, becomes engaged to Atticus Aldridge, son of Lord and Lady Sinderby. Lord Sinderby strongly objects to Atticus marrying outside the Jewish faith. Lord Merton proposes to Isobel Crawley (Matthew's mother). She accepts, but later ends the engagement due to Lord Merton's sons' disparaging comments over her status as a commoner. Lady Flintshire employs underhanded schemes to derail Rose and Atticus's engagement, including announcing to everyone at the wedding that she and her husband are divorcing, intending to cause a scandal to stop Rose's marriage to Atticus; they are married anyway.

When Anna is arrested on suspicion of Mr Green's murder, Bates writes a false confession before fleeing to Ireland. Baxter and footman Molesley are able to prove that Bates was in York at the time of the murder. This new information allows Anna to be released. Cora eventually learns the truth about Marigold and wants her raised at Downton; Marigold is presented as Edith's ward, but Robert and Tom eventually discern the truth: only Mary is still unaware. When a war memorial is unveiled in the village, Robert arranges for a separate plaque to honour the cook Mrs Patmore's late nephew, who was shot for cowardice and excluded from his own village's memorial.

The Crawleys are invited to Brancaster Castle, which Lord and Lady Sinderby have rented for a shooting party. While there, Lady Rose, with help from the Crawleys, defuses a personal near-disaster for Lord Sinderby, earning his gratitude and securing his approval of Rose. A second footman, Andy, is hired on Barrow's recommendation. During the Downton Abbey Christmas celebration, Tom Branson announces he is moving to the U.S. to work for his cousin, taking daughter Sybil with him. Carson proposes marriage to Mrs Hughes and she accepts.

Cast and characters

Main cast

Upstairs
Hugh Bonneville as Robert Crawley, Earl of Grantham
Laura Carmichael as Lady Edith Crawley
Michelle Dockery as Lady Mary Crawley
Elizabeth McGovern as Cora Crawley, Countess of Grantham
Maggie Smith as Violet Crawley, Dowager Countess of Grantham
Penelope Wilton as Mrs Isobel Crawley

Downstairs
Jim Carter as Mr Charles Carson; the Butler
Phyllis Logan as Mrs Elsie Hughes; the Housekeeper
Brendan Coyle as Mr John Bates; Lord Grantham's valet
Joanne Froggatt as Miss Anna Smith; head housemaid
Lesley Nicol as Mrs Beryl Patmore; the cook
Sophie McShera as Daisy Robinson; a kitchen maid

Episodes

External links
 

Downton Abbey series